Roggwil-Berg railway station is a railway station in Roggwil, in the Swiss canton of Thurgau. The station sits just over the border from the Canton of St. Gallen, and its name comes from the Thurgau municipality of Roggwil and the nearby St. Gallen municipality of Berg. It is an intermediate stop on the Bodensee–Toggenburg line and is served by local trains only.

Services 
Roggwil-Berg is served by the S1 of the St. Gallen S-Bahn:

 : half-hourly service between Schaffhausen and Wil via St. Gallen.

References

External links 
 
 

Railway stations in the canton of Thurgau
Südostbahn stations